Jahnstadion is a multi-use stadium in Göttingen, Germany, and the largest of its kind in the city.   and serves as the home of the RSV Göttingen 05. The stadium holds 17,000 people.

References

Football venues in Germany
Göttingen
Sports venues in Lower Saxony
Buildings and structures in Göttingen (district)